Carlos Chávez (born 21 November 1963) is a Guatemalan former tennis player.

Chávez was a singles bronze medalist at the 1986 Central American and Caribbean Games and also competed for Guatemala at the 1987 Pan American Games, where he made it through to the knockout stage of the singles event.

The eldest of four brothers to represent Guatemala in the Davis Cup, Chávez made his debut in a 1991 tie against the Eastern Caribbean team and lost a close singles rubber to John Maginley, 7–9 in the fifth set. Chávez's only other appearance came as a doubles player in 1994, partnering brother Daniel in a five-set loss to a pair from Colombia. His younger brothers Jacobo and Manuel have also played in the Davis Cup.

References

External links
 
 

1963 births
Living people
Guatemalan male tennis players
Competitors at the 1986 Central American and Caribbean Games
Central American and Caribbean Games medalists in tennis
Central American and Caribbean Games silver medalists for Guatemala
Central American and Caribbean Games bronze medalists for Guatemala
Tennis players at the 1987 Pan American Games
Pan American Games competitors for Guatemala